The Goldfinch is a painting by the Dutch Golden Age artist Carel Fabritius of a life-sized chained goldfinch. Signed and dated 1654, it is now in the collection of the Mauritshuis in The Hague, Netherlands. The work is a trompe-l'œil oil on panel measuring  that was once part of a larger structure, perhaps a window jamb or a protective cover. It is possible that the painting was in its creator's workshop in Delft at the time of the gunpowder explosion that killed him and destroyed much of the city.

A common and colourful bird with a pleasant song, the goldfinch was a popular pet, and could be taught simple tricks including lifting a thimble-sized bucket of water. It was reputedly a bringer of good health, and was used in Italian Renaissance painting as a symbol of Christian redemption and the Passion of Jesus.

The Goldfinch is unusual for the Dutch Golden Age painting period in the simplicity of its composition and use of illusionary techniques. Following the death of its creator, it was lost for more than two centuries before its rediscovery in Brussels. It plays a central role in the Pulitzer Prize–winning novel The Goldfinch by Donna Tartt and its film adaptation.

Description

Details of its physical structure emerged when it was restored in 2003. Because the lead-based paint limited the effectiveness of traditional X-rays and infrared, chief conservator Jorgen Wadum used a CT scanner to digitally eliminate the paint layer and see what was underneath.
Evidence for this is the remains of a wooden pin, suggesting the original boards had been joined with dowels and glue. Before it was framed, the painting had a  black border onto which a gilded frame was later fixed with ten equally spaced nails. The nails did not reach the back of the panel so there is no evidence of a backing to the picture. The frame was subsequently removed leaving only a residual line of a greenish copper compound. Fabritius then extended the white background pigment to the right edge, repainted his signature, and added the lower perch. Finally, the remaining black edges were overpainted with white.

The back of the panel has four nail holes and six other holes near the top, suggesting two different methods of suspension of the panel at various times. The art historian Linda Stone-Ferrier has suggested that the panel may have been either attached to the inner jamb of a window or have been a hinged protective cover for another wall-mounted painting.

During conservation, it was realised that the surface of the painting had numerous small dents that must have been formed when the paint was still not fully dried, since there was no cracking. It is possible that the slight damage was caused by the explosion that killed its creator. The restoration removed the old yellow varnish and showed the original tones, described by the art critic Théophile Thoré-Bürger in 1859 as mur blême and lumineuse couleur ("pale wall" and "bright colour").

The subject

The painting shows a life-size European goldfinch (Carduelis carduelis) on top of a feeder—a blue container with a lid, enclosed by two wooden half-rings fixed to the wall. The bird is perched on the upper ring, to which its leg is attached by a fine chain. The painting is signed and dated "" at the bottom.

The goldfinch is a widespread and common seed-eating bird in Europe, North Africa, and western and central Asia. As a colourful species with a pleasant twittering song, and an associated belief that it brought health and good fortune, it had been domesticated for at least 2,000 years. Pliny recorded that it could be taught to do tricks, and in the 17th century, it became fashionable to train goldfinches to draw water from a bowl with a miniature bucket on a chain. The Dutch title of the painting is the bird's nickname puttertje, which refers to this custom and is a diminutive equivalent to "draw-water", an old Norfolk name for the bird.

The goldfinch frequently appears in paintings, not just for its colourful appearance but also for its symbolic meanings. Pliny associated the bird with fertility, and the presence of a giant goldfinch next to a naked couple in The Garden of Earthly Delights triptych by the earlier Dutch master Hieronymus Bosch perhaps refers to this belief.

Nearly 500 Renaissance religious paintings, mainly by Italian artists, show the bird, including Leonardo da Vinci's Madonna Litta (1490–1491), Raphael's Madonna of the Goldfinch (1506) and Piero della Francesca's Nativity (1470–1475) In Medieval Christianity, the goldfinch's association with health symbolises the Redemption, and its habit of feeding on the seeds of spiky thistles, together with its red face, presaged the crucifixion of Jesus, where the bird supposedly became splattered with blood while attempting to remove the crown of thorns. Many of these devotional paintings were created in the middle of the fourteenth century while the Black Death pandemic gripped Europe.

The symbolism persisted long after the time of Fabritius. A much later example of the goldfinch as a symbol of redemption is Hogarth’s 1742 painting The Graham Children. Thomas, the youngest, had died by the time the painting was completed.

The goldfinch in art

Style

The Goldfinch is a trompe-l'œil painting which uses artistic techniques to create the illusion of depth, notably through foreshortening of the head, but also by highlights on the rings and the bird's foot, and strong shadows on the plastered wall. Bold strokes of bright colours above and lighter touches of duller colours below also accentuate the visual effect. The viewpoint seems to be from slightly below the bird, suggesting it was intended to be mounted in an elevated position. The lack of a frame initially also suggests the painting may have been mounted to look realistic, and may have been part of a larger assemblage of illusionary paintings.
 
Stone-Ferrier's supposition that it may at one time have been part of a window jamb relies in part on the painting giving the illusion of a real perched bird to passers-by, which is consistent with a raised location. She notes the importance of windows as picture settings during the Dutch Golden Age and the use of perspective boxes to create realistic interiors. Fabritius used a perspective box to create depth in other paintings, including his A View of Delft.

Fabritius used lead white paint as the base for the cream plaster of the walls, contrasting with the tan shadow of the bird. The art historian Andrew Graham-Dixon considered that the blend of colours in the diffuse shadow foreshadowed some of the techniques of the nineteenth-century French Impressionist and Post-Impressionist artists.

The trompe-l'œil technique has been known since ancient times, Pliny telling the story of Zeuxis painting grapes so real that birds flew down to peck at them. Jacopo de' Barbari's A Sparrowhawk is a Renaissance example of a painting that seemed intended to be mounted to create an illusion of reality to people passing the window. Although several of Fabritius's contemporaries, including his master Rembrandt, used similar effects, the depiction of a single bird is a minimalist version of the genre, and the simplicity of the design combined with the perspective technique in The Goldfinch is unique among paintings of the Dutch Golden Age. Fabritius had previously experimented with trompe-l'œil with the realistic nail that appears to be protruding from his 1649 Portrait of Abraham de Potter.

The art historian Wilhelm Martin (1876–1954) considered that The Goldfinch could only be compared with the Still-Life with Partridge and Gauntlets painted by Jacopo de' Barbari in 1504, more than a hundred years earlier. The bird itself was created with broad brush strokes, with only minor later corrections to its outline, while details, including the chain, were added with more precision. Fabritius's style differs from Rembrandt's typical chiaroscuro in his use of cool daylight, complex perspective, and dark figures against a light background, although he retains some of his master's techniques such as using the handle end of the brush to scratch lines through thick paint.

Artist

Carel Pietersz Fabritius was born in 1622 in Middenbeemster in the Dutch Republic. Initially he worked as a carpenter. His father and his brothers Barent and Johannes were painters and, although not formally trained in art, Fabritius's ability gained him a place at Rembrandt's studio in Amsterdam. The move to Amsterdam took place in 1641, the same year Fabritius married his first wife, who came from a well-to-do family. Following her death in 1643, he moved back to Middenbeemster, where he lived until the early 1650s, then to Delft, where he joined the Guild of Saint Luke in 1652.

Fabritius died aged 32, caught in the explosion of the Delft gunpowder magazine on October 12, 1654, which killed at least 100 people and destroyed a quarter of the city, including his studio and many of his paintings. Few of his works are known to have survived. According to his biographer, Arnold Houbraken, Fabritius's student Mattias Spoors and church deacon Simon Decker also died as a result of the explosion. The Goldfinch was painted in the year Fabritius died.

Fabritius's works were well regarded by his contemporaries, and his style influenced other notable Dutch painters of the period, including Pieter de Hooch, Emanuel de Witte and Johannes Vermeer. Vermeer, who also lived in Delft, in particular used similar pale, worn walls lit by bright sunlight, and it has been suggested that he was Fabritius's student, although there is no real evidence for this claim.

Provenance

The Goldfinch was lost and unknown for more than two centuries before it first came to light in 1859. Théophile Thoré-Bürger, who had helped to restore the reputation of Vermeer, found it in the collection of former Dutch army officer and collector Chevalier Joseph-Guillaume-Jean Camberlyn in Brussels. It was subsequently given to Thoré-Bürger by the chevalier's heirs in 1865, and he in turn bequeathed it with the rest of his collection to his companion, Apolline Lacroix, in 1869, three years after its first public exhibition in Paris in 1866.

It was sold to Étienne-François Haro, a painter, restorer and art dealer, for 5,500 francs at the Hôtel Drouot auction house in Paris on 5December 1892, and later purchased for the Mauritshuis by its curator and art collector Abraham Bredius for 6,200 francs at the sale of the Émile Martinet collection, also at Hôtel Drouot, on 27 February 1896. As well as The Goldfinch, Martinet's collection included works attributed to other renowned artists such as Rembrandt, Goya, Steen, and Corot, and La Pythonisse, a work tentatively attributed to Fabritius's brother, Barent.

The painting is now in the collection of the Mauritshuis in The Hague.

Cultural references and exhibitions

The Goldfinch plays a central role in the 2013 eponymous novel by American author Donna Tartt. The novel's protagonist, 13-year-old Theodore "Theo" Decker, survives a terrorist bombing at New York's Metropolitan Museum of Art in which his mother dies. He takes the Fabritius painting, part of a Dutch Golden Age exhibition, with him as he escapes the building, and much of the rest of the book is based around his attempts to hide the picture, its theft and eventual return.

The book won the 2014 Pulitzer Prize for fiction, and was a commercial success with sales reaching nearly 1.5 million soon after the award. The book's cover is itself a trompe l'oeil, the painting visible through an illusionary tear in the paper. In reality, the painting has never been displayed in the Metropolitan Museum, although coincidentally an exhibition including The Goldfinch opened at New York's Frick Collection on the day of the novel's publication. An estimated 200,000–235,000 people attended the Frick exhibition, despite freezing temperatures, and 13,000 people joined the museum, quadrupling its subscription base.

The 2013–2014 Frick exhibition was part of a world tour of selected Golden Age paintings from the Mauritshuis during its two-year closure for a £25m renovation of the gallery, with previous showings in Tokyo, Kobe, San Francisco, Atlanta and New York, and finishing with a visit to Bologna. The Tokyo exhibition was attended by a million people, making it the most visited such event of the year. Prior to the publicity from the release of Donna Tartt's novel, Vermeer's Girl with a Pearl Earring had typically been highlighted as the main attraction of the exhibition.

Tartt's book was adapted as a 2019 film produced by Warner Bros and Amazon Studios, directed by John Crowley, and starring Ansel Elgort and Nicole Kidman. Other cultural references to The Goldfinch include American artist Helen Frankenthaler's 1960 abstract expressionist interpretation of the 1654 painting titled the Fabritius Bird, and US poet Morri Creech's 2010 poem "Goldfinch", which includes the line "You stare/ from a modest trompe l'oeil heaven we don't share".

The Goldfinch was one of eight Mauritshuis masterpieces depicted on a set of €1.00 stamps issued in 2014 by the Dutch postal service, PostNL, to mark the reopening of the museum. It also featured in a 2004 set of stamps showing works by Fabritius.

References

Notes

Selected bibliography

External links

 The Goldfinch at the Mauritshuis website, including an audio description in English and an animation (captioned in Dutch) for the Edinburgh exhibition.

1654 paintings
Birds in art
Paintings by Carel Fabritius
Paintings in the collection of the Mauritshuis
Trompe-l'œil paintings